Events from the year 1761 in France.

Incumbents 
Monarch: Louis XV

Events

Births
 

 February 16 – Charles Pichegru, French general (d. 1804)
 March 6 – Antoine-Francois Andreossy, French general (d. 1828)
 October 21 – Louis Albert Guislain Bacler d'Albe, French painter and cartographer (d. 1824)
 November 4 – Bertrand Andrieu, French engraver of medals (d. 1822)
 December 1 – Marie Tussaud, French wax modeller (d. 1850)

Deaths
 

 September 8 – Bernard Forest de Bélidor, French engineer (b. 1698)

See also

References

1760s in France